Lenny Williams (born December 16, 1981 in Lake Charles, Louisiana) is a former Canadian football cornerback for the Edmonton Eskimos of the Canadian Football League.  He played college football at Southern University.  Williams recently signed with the Edmonton Eskimos of the Canadian Football League.  He signed a practice roster agreement.

External links
Just Sports Stats

1981 births
Living people
American football cornerbacks
Canadian football defensive backs
Dallas Cowboys players
Edmonton Elks players
Sportspeople from Lake Charles, Louisiana
Southern Jaguars football players